Villach is the seventh-largest city in Austria and the second-largest in the federal state of Carinthia. It is an important traffic junction for southern Austria and the whole Alpe-Adria region. , the population is 61,887.

Together with other Alpine towns Villach engages in the Alpine Town of the Year Association for the implementation of the Alpine Convention to achieve sustainable development in the Alpine Arc. 
In 1997, Villach was the first town to be awarded Alpine Town of the Year.

Geography

Villach is a statutory city, on the Drau River near its confluence with the Gail tributary, at the western rim of the Klagenfurt basin. The municipal area stretches from the slopes of the Gailtal Alps (Mt. Dobratsch) down to Lake Ossiach in the northeast.

The Villach city limits comprise the following districts and villages:

In 1905 a part of the municipal area St. Martin was incorporated. In 1973 the city area was further enlarged through the incorporation of Landskron, Maria Gail and Fellach.

Climate 
Villach has a cool summer humid continental climate (Köppen Dfb).

History

The oldest human traces found in Villach date back to the late Neolithic. Many Roman artifacts have been discovered in the city and its vicinity, as it was near an important Roman road (today called Römerweg) leading from Italy into the Noricum province established in 15 BC. At the time, a mansio named Sanctium was probably located at the hot spring in the present-day Warmbad quarter south of the city centre. After the Migration Period and the Slavic settlement of the Eastern Alps about 600 AD, the area became part of the Carantania principality.

When about 740 Prince Boruth enlisted the aid of Duke Odilo of Bavaria against the invading Avars, he had to accept Bavarian overlordship. An 878 deed of donation, issued by the Carolingian ruler Carloman of Bavaria, mentioned a bridge (ad pontem Uillach) near the royal court of Treffen, in what is today Villach. In 979 Emperor Otto II enfeoffed Bishop Albuin of Brixen with the Villach manor. After his death, King Henry II in 1007 ceded the settlement to the newly established Bishopric of Bamberg. The bishops also held the adjacent estates along the strategically important route to Italy up to Pontafel, which they retained until 1759 while the surrounding Carinthian ducal lands passed to the Austrian House of Habsburg in 1335. 

Villach received market rights in 1060, though it was not mentioned as a town in records until about 1240. The parish church dedicated to St. James was first documented in 1136. Emperor Frederick II conferred the citizens the right to hold an annual fair on the feast of 25 July (Jakobitag) in 1222. The 1348 Friuli earthquake devastated large parts of the town; another devastating earthquake occurred in 1690. There were also several fires in Villach, which destroyed many buildings. The first documented mayor took office in the 16th century.

From 1526 onwards, many citizens turned Protestant and the Villach parish became a centre of the new faith within the Carinthian estates, which entailed harsh Counter-Reformation measures by the ecclesiastical rulers. From about 1600, numerous residents were forced to leave the town, precipitating an economic decline. In 1759 the Habsburg empress Maria Theresa formally purchased the Bamberg territories in Carinthia for a price of one million florins. Villach was incorporated into the "hereditary lands" of the Habsburg monarchy and became the administrative seat of a Carinthian district.

During the Napoleonic Wars, the city was occupied by French troops and became part of the short-lived Illyrian Provinces from 1809, until it was re-conquered by the forces of the Austrian Empire in 1813 and incorporated into the Austrian Kingdom of Illyria by 1816. The city's economy was decisively promoted by a western branch of the Southern Railway line, which finally reached Villach in 1864, providing growth and expansion. By 1880, the town had a population of 6,104. In World War I, Villach near the Italian front was the seat of the 10th Army command of the Austro-Hungarian Army.

The town obtained statutory city status during the interwar period on 1 January 1932. After the Austrian Anschluss to Nazi Germany in 1938, the mayor of Villach was Oskar Kraus, an enthusiastic Nazi. On 9 November 1938 Villach was a site of the nationwide Kristallnacht pogroms with violent attacks on the Jewish population. A memorial for the 1919 border conflict that led to the Carinthian Plebiscite caused controversy when it was inaugurated in 2002, as Kraus, who had not been especially prominent in the conflict, was the only person named.

During World War II, allied forces bombed Villach 37 times. About 42,500 bombs killed 300 people and damaged 85% of the buildings. Nevertheless, the city quickly recovered. Today, Villach is a bustling city with commerce and recreation, yet it retains its historic background.

Population

Politics

Municipal council
The municipal council (Gemeinderat) consists of 45 members, with the mayor as president, and following the 2015 elections:

 Social Democratic Party of Austria (SPÖ): 23 seats
 Austrian People's Party (ÖVP): 10 seats
 Freedom Party of Austria (FPÖ): 7 seats
 Austrian Green Party: 3 seats
 Verantwortung Erde: 1 seat
 NEOS: 1 seat

City government
The city government of Villach (Stadtsenat) consists of seven members. It is chaired by the mayor, who is directly elected by the people. The other members—two vice-mayors and four town councillors—are appointed by the municipal council, with party affiliations according to the election results.

Mayor Günther Albel, SPÖ
First vice-mayor Mag. Dr. Petra Oberrauner, SPÖ
Second vice-mayor Mag. Gerda Sandriesser, SPÖ
Councillor Mag. Peter F. Weidinger, ÖVP
Councillor Erwin Baumann, FPÖ
Councillor Mag. Harald Sobe, SPÖ
Councillor Katharina Spanring, ÖVP

In the March 2015 elections, Günther Albel was elected with 55.46 per cent of the votes cast.

Twin towns—sister cities
Villach is twinned with:

  Bamberg, Germany
  Udine, Italy
  Suresnes, France

Festivals

There are several festivals throughout the year:

The carnival in Villach (which starts on November 11 and ends on March 4)
The arts and crafts festival (with self made goods)
Villacher Fasching or Mardi Gras
The streets-art festival (displays performances of artists and singers)
The "Villacher Kirchtag" (a festival spanning a whole week in summer and ends on August's first Saturday.)
Performances on a floating stage on the Drau River

Notable citizens

 Anton Janežič, (1828 in St. Jakob im Rosental – 1869) Carinthian Slovene linguist, philologist, author, and literary historian.
 Oskar Potiorek (1853 in Bad Bleiberg – 1933) Austro-Hungarian Army officer, Governor of Bosnia and Herzegovina in Sarajevo from 1911 to 1914, when Archduke Franz Ferdinand of Austria was assassinated there
 Anton Ghon (1866 in Villach – 1936) Austrian pathologist viz Ghon focus and Ghon's complex 
 Hans Kurath (1891 in Villach – 1992) American linguist of Austrian origin, emigrated to the US in 1907
 Carl-Heinz Birnbacher (1910 in Villach – 1991) German naval officer of Austrian origin, Vice admiral of the German Navy
 Albert Bach (1910 in Treffen – 2003) Austrian soldier, Generalmajor, and skier, competed at the 1936 Winter Olympics.
 Hubert Petschnigg (1913 – 1997) Austrian architect, born in Klagenfurt, went to school in Villach. 
 Heidemarie Hatheyer (1918 in Villach – 1990) Austrian film actress, appearing in 43 films between 1938 and 1988
 Paul Watzlawick (1921 in Villach – 2007) Austrian-American therapist, psychologist, communications theorist and philosopher.
 Kurt Diemberger (born 1932), mountaineer and author
 Bruno Gironcoli (1936 in Villach – 2010) Austrian modern artist
 Heidelinde Weis (born 1940) Austrian actress
 Hermann Knoflacher (born 1940 in Villach) Austrian civil engineer. 
 Peter Brabeck-Letmathe (born 1944 in Villach), former CEO of the Nestlé Group
 George Zebrowski (born 1945 in Villach) American science fiction author and editor
 Zoltan J. Acs (born 1947 in Villach) American economist and Professor of Management at The London School of Economics 
 Felix Tretter (born 1949 in Villach) Austrian psychologist, psychiatrist and cybernetician
 Werner Kofler (1947 in Villach – 2011) Austrian postmodernism novelist
 Gerald Kargl (born 1953 in Villach) Austrian film director most famous for directing the 1983 film Angst
 Wolfgang Ilgenfritz (1957 in Villach – 2013) Austrian politician and notably a non-attached Member of the European Parliament
 Gernot Rumpold (born 1957 in Villach) Austrian politician, associate of Jörg Haider
 Peter Löscher (born 1957 in Villach) Austrian businessman with Merck & Co now CEO of Siemens since 2007 
 Michael Martin Kofler (born 1966), classical flautist
 Eva Glawischnig-Piesczek (born 1969 in Villach) Austrian politician of the Austrian Green Party
 Alexander Kaimbacher (born 1969), Austrian operatic tenor
 Thomas Smolej (1982 in Villach) Austrian actor and director
 Florian Hufsky (1986 in Villach – 2009) Austrian new media artist, board member of the Pirate Party of Austria

Sport 

 Ernst Melchior (1920 in Villach – 1978) Austrian football player for Austria Wien, FC Rouen and FC Nantes
 Hanns Brandstätter (born 1949 in Villach) Austrian fencer. He competed in at the 72, 76, and 1984 Summer Olympics
 Johann "Hans" Lindner (born 1959 in Tragail) hammer thrower 1984 Summer Olympics and bobsledder in 1984 Winter Olympics
 Alfred Groyer (born 1959) Austrian former ski jumper who competed from 1978 to 1984 and in the 1980 Winter Olympics 
 Alex Antonitsch (born 1966 in Villach) former tennis player from Austria, turned professional in 1988
 Bärbel Jungmeier (born 1975 in Villach) road cyclist and mountain bike rider competed in the 2004 Summer Olympics 
 Gerhard Unterluggauer (born 1976 in Villach) Austrian former professional ice hockey defenceman
 Roland Kollmann (born 1976 in Villach) retired Austrian football for Grazer AK 
 Daniel Mesotitsch (born 1976 in Villach) Austrian biathlete 
 Friedrich Pinter (born 1978 in Villach) Austrian former biathlete
 Martin Koch (born 1982 in Villach) Austrian former ski jumper
 Michael Grabner, (born 1987 in Villach) Austrian professional ice hockey player for New York Rangers of National Hockey League
 Marc Sand (born 1988 in Rosegg) Austrian footballer, who plays for SK Austria Klagenfurt
 Michael Raffl (born 1988 in Villach) Austrian professional ice hockey left winger for Dallas Stars of National Hockey League
 Guido Burgstaller (born 1989 in Villach) Austrian professional footballer who plays as a striker for Rapid Wien
 Anna Gasser (born 1991 in Villach) Austrian snowboarder, two-time Olympic gold medalist in Big Air (2018 and 2022)
 Marco Schwarz (born 1995 in Villach) Austrian World Cup alpine ski racer
 Christopher Höher (born 1997 in Villach) Austrian racing driver

References

External links

 Villach - Official website (English version)
Kowatsch - Villach Bus System official site
Official website of the Carinthia University of Applied Sciences - FH Kärnten

 
Districts of Carinthia (state)
Cities and towns in Carinthia (state)